Yarabad may refer to:
 Yarabad, Kakavand, Lorestan Province
 Yarabad Mirbeyg
 Yarabad-e Olya, Ilam Province

See also
Yariabad (disambiguation)